Muradpur Dona  is a village in Kapurthala district of Punjab State, India. The village is administrated by a Sarpanch who is an elected representative of village as per the constitution of India and Panchayati raj (India).

Demography 
According to the report published by Census India in 2011, Muradpur Dona has 4 houses with the total population of 15 persons of which 7 are male and 8 females. Literacy rate of  Muradpur Dona is 66.67%, lower than the state average of 75.84%.  The population of children in the age group 0–6 years is 0 which is 0.00% of the total population.  Child sex ratio is 0, lower than the state average of 846.

Population data

References

External links
  Villages in Kapurthala
 Kapurthala Villages List

Villages in Kapurthala district